Sans titre is the 2009 studio album of Corneille. It was released in 2009 reaching #21 on the French Albums Chart and staying for 10 weeks in the chart.

Track listing
 "Elle me ment"
 "En attendant"
 "Sans nous"
 "Ma comédie"
 "Le parasite"
 "Pauvre cynique"
 "Voleuse de lendemain"
 "Star! Vite fait!"
 "Vieillir avec toi"
 "Je me pardonne"

References

2009 albums
Corneille (singer) albums